Sir David Howard Perry, KCB, FRAeS (born 1931) was an English civil servant and engineer. Educated at Pembroke College, Cambridge, he became a chartered engineer and entered the Royal Aircraft Establishment in 1954, eventually becoming head of the Dynamics Division (1971–73) and the Systems Assessment Department (1975–77). Moving to the Ministry of Defence in 1978, he was the Controller of Aircraft in 1982, Chief of Defence Procurement from 1983 to 1985 and Chief of Defence Equipment Collaboration from 1985 to 1987.

References 

1931 births
Living people
English civil servants
English engineers
Alumni of Pembroke College, Cambridge
Knights Companion of the Order of the Bath
Fellows of the Royal Aeronautical Society